The 2019 Open de Cagnes-sur-Mer Alpes-Maritimes was a professional tennis tournament played on outdoor clay courts. It was the twenty-second edition of the tournament which was part of the 2019 ITF Women's World Tennis Tour. It took place in Cagnes-sur-Mer, France between 6 and 12 May 2019.

Singles main-draw entrants

Seeds

 1 Rankings are as of 29 April 2019.

Other entrants
The following players received wildcards into the singles main draw:
  Julie Gervais
  Diane Parry
  Gabriella Price
  Harmony Tan

The following player received entry as a special exempt:
  Katarina Zavatska

The following players received entry from the qualifying draw:
  Carolina Alves
  Martina Di Giuseppe
  Varvara Gracheva
  Ylena In-Albon
  Alizé Lim
  Irina Ramialison
  Marie Témin
  Margot Yerolymos

The following player received entry as a lucky loser:
  Anna Kalinskaya

Champions

Singles

 Christina McHale def.  Stefanie Vögele, 7–6(7–4), 6–2

Doubles

 Anna Blinkova /  Xenia Knoll def.  Beatriz Haddad Maia /  Luisa Stefani, 4–6, 6–2, [14–12]

References

External links
 2019 Open de Cagnes-sur-Mer at ITFtennis.com
 Official website

2019 ITF Women's World Tennis Tour
2019 in French tennis
Open de Cagnes-sur-Mer